Matei Tănasă (born 8 October 2005) is a Romanian footballer who plays for FCSB, as a midfielder.

Career statistics

Club

References

External links
 

2005 births
Living people
Sportspeople from Iași
Romanian footballers
Association football midfielders
FC Steaua București players
Liga I players